Louis-François or Louis François may refer to:
 Louis François, Prince of Conti (1717–1776), French nobleman
 Louis François Joseph, Prince of Conti (1734–1814), son of Louis François I
 Louis-François de Bausset (1748–1824), French cardinal and writer
 Louis-François Bertin (1766–1841), French journalist
 Louis-François de Boufflers (1644–1711), Marshal of France 
 Louis François Cauchy (1760–1848), French official, father of mathematician Augustin Louis Cauchy
 Louis-François Dunière (1754–1828), businessman in Lower Canada
 Louis-François Richer Laflèche (1818–1898), Roman Catholic Bishop of Trois-Rivières, Quebec, Native American missionary
 Louis-François Lejeune (1775–1848), French general, painter, and lithographer
 Louis François de Pourtalès (1824–1880), American naturalist
 Louis-François Roubiliac (1702–1762), French sculptor
 Louis-François Bertin de Vaux (1771–1842), French journalist, brother of Bertin
 Louis François (wrestler) (1906–1986), French Olympic wrestler

See also
François-Louis (disambiguation)